This is a list of the 49 electoral districts used for elections to the Legislative Assembly of New Brunswick, in Canada.

Electoral district breakdown (Riding by Riding)

Capital 
 Carleton-York
 Fredericton North
 Fredericton South
 Fredericton West-Hanwell
 Fredericton-Grand Lake
 Fredericton-York
 New Maryland-Sunbury
 Oromocto-Lincoln

Northern 
 Bathurst East-Nepisiguit-Saint-Isidore
 Bathurst West-Beresford
 Campbellton-Dalhousie
 Caraquet
 Miramichi
 Miramichi Bay-Neguac
 Restigouche West
 Restigouche-Chaleur
 Shippagan-Lamèque-Miscou
 Southwest Miramichi-Bay du Vin
 Tracadie-Sheila

River Valley 
 Carleton
 Carleton-Victoria
 Edmundston-Madawaska Centre
 Madawaska-les-Lacs-Edmundston
 Victoria-La Vallée

South 
 Fundy-The Isles-Saint John West
 Hampton
 Kings Centre
 Portland-Simonds
 Quispamsis
 Rothesay
 Saint Croix
 Saint John East
 Saint John Harbour
 Saint John Lancaster
 Sussex-Fundy-St. Martins

Southeast 

 Albert
 Dieppe
Kent North
 Kent South
 Memramcook-Tantramar
 Moncton Centre
 Moncton East
 Moncton Northwest
 Moncton Southwest
 Moncton South
 Gagetown-Petitcodiac
 Riverview
 Shediac Bay-Dieppe
 Shediac-Beaubassin-Cap-Pelé

See also 
 2013 electoral redistribution
 List of New Brunswick general elections (post-Confederation)
 2014 New Brunswick general election

New Brunswick, provincial
Electoral districts, provincial